Alois Bubák (20 August 1824,  Kosmonosy – 6 March 1870, Prague) was a Czech painter of landscapes and an illustrator.

He was a son of a wood carver. After graduating from a gymnasium in  Mladá Boleslav, he started to study at a college of theology in Prague on the wish of his parents. However, his talent and love of art soon brought him to the Academy of Fine Arts in Prague. His teachers were Mr. Ruben, director of the academy, and Maximilian Joseph Haushofer, a landscape painter. Both appreciated his fast progress and his desire for an original artistic expression.

He focused on landscape art. As a student, he traveled to the Krkonoše (Giant Mountains), the Alps and South-West Bohemia. He then successfully presented his works on several exhibitions. The famous ones included Landscape around the Elbe, Landscape under Studničov, Gossau Lake and two paintings from Bad Ischl area. Emperor Ferdinand I of Austria bought his depiction of Holná pond in South Bohemia. Critics also appreciated his Plökenstein Lake in Bohemian Forest, for its realism, detail in the front and broad perspective in the rear. According to them, this painting overpassed those of his teacher Haushofer. Other famous landscapes included Rainy weather in the Alps, Bezděz Area, Around Trosky and others.

Apart from creating oil paintings and aquarelles, he also taught painting at a business academy and at a high school for girls in Prague. He contributed many illustrations to Květy and Světozor magazines (e.g., Hvězda Summer Villa or Strakonice palace).

He was very active and hard-working, painting and teaching tirelessly to support his large family. The persistent strain and a lack of rest contributed to his contracting of tuberculosis in the summer of 1868 and his premature death two years later.

References

1824 births
1870 deaths
People from Kosmonosy
Czech illustrators
Academy of Fine Arts, Prague alumni
19th-century Czech painters
Czech male painters
19th-century Czech male artists